Stilbocrea is a genus of fungi in the class Sordariomycetes. A 2008 estimate placed six species in the genus.

References

Hypocreales genera
Bionectriaceae
Taxa described in 1900